Kalat-e Jahal (also Romanized as Kalāt-e Jahal) is a village in Zarabad-e Sharqi Rural District, Zarabad District, Konarak County, Sistan and Baluchestan Province, Iran. At the 2006 census, its population was 154, in 38 families.

References 

Populated places in Konarak County